, known in Spain as Pipi, is a Japanese footballer who plays as a midfielder for Spanish club Real Madrid Castilla. He was included in The Guardians "Next Generation 2021".

Club career
Pipi was born in Shiga, Japan, and was spotted by Spanish giants Real Madrid while playing in one of their training camps in Japan. He was invited for a trial in Spain and impressed enough to sign a contract in 2014. Prior to his move to Spain, Pipi had been playing for Azul Shiga. After Real Madrid was sanctioned heavily in 2016 by the Court of Arbitration for Sport (CAS), it was Nakai's mother who offered testimony that prevented Madrid from suffering further punishment. Her testimony also meant that her son would avoid punishment, as his move to Madrid had been under investigation by the CAS.

In October 2020, Pipi was called up to train with the Real Madrid senior squad for the first time. He is seen as one of Real Madrid's best prospects.

In February 2022, Pipi signed a contract extension with Real Madrid until 2025. Starting from the 2022-23 season, Pipi will be promoted to Real Madrid Castilla from Real Madrid U-19.  Pipi made his debut for Castilla on September 25, 2022, coming on as a substitute in a 3–1 victory over CD Badajoz.

International career
Pipi was called up for the Japan under-15 side in 2018.

References

External links
 Real Madrid profile
 
 
 

2003 births
Living people
People from Ōtsu, Shiga
Association football people from Shiga Prefecture
Japanese footballers
Association football midfielders
Japan youth international footballers
Real Madrid CF players
Japanese expatriate footballers
Japanese expatriate sportspeople in Spain
Expatriate footballers in Spain